Židikai Marija Pečkauskaitė secondary school is a secondary school located in Židikai, Lithuania.

This school is the oldest one in Mažeikiai district municipality. It was founded in 1865. In 1989 the name of Marija Pečkauskaitė was given to school in order to honor famous author and educational Šatrijos Ragana who lived in Židikai from 1915 until her death in 1930.

Principals of the school 
 Juozas Garška (1940–1948)
 Algirdas Gailius (1949–1956)
 Irena Paulauskienė (1956–1958)
 Birutė Kekienė (1959–1964)
 Aleksandras Bašermanovas (1964–1969)
 Vytautas Rimiškis (1969–1975)
 Alfonsas Dagys (1975–1985)
 Paulius Perminas (1985–1990)
 Andrius Meinorius (1990–1993)
 Rima Širvinskienė (1993–present)

External links 
Official page
School' page in project "Drąsinkime ateitį"

Secondary schools in Lithuania
Educational institutions established in 1865
1865 establishments in the Russian Empire